Pavel Sergeyevich Vorobyev (born May 5, 1982) is a Russian former professional ice hockey right winger who last played for Ukrainian Hockey League side Dnipro Kherson. Vorobyev previously iced with Gyergyói HK in the Erste Liga, and played with the Edinburgh Capitals of the EIHL between 2016 and 2018.

Playing career
Vorobyev was drafted in the 1st round, 11th overall, by the Chicago Blackhawks in the 2000 NHL Entry Draft.
After playing for the Blackhawks for two seasons, Vorobyev announced in August, 2006, that he would not be returning to the team, but would instead play in Russia. Vorobyev accused Americans, but especially the Blackhawks organization, of being biased against Russians. The Blackhawks had the NHL rights to Vorobyev until the end of the 2008–09 season. Vorobyev has not ruled out playing in the NHL again, and said he hopes the Blackhawks trade his NHL rights.

Career statistics

Regular season and playoffs

International

References

External links

1982 births
Chicago Blackhawks draft picks
Chicago Blackhawks players
Atlant Moscow Oblast players
HC Budivelnyk players
HC MVD players
Severstal Cherepovets players
HC Spartak Moscow players
Living people
Lokomotiv Yaroslavl players
National Hockey League first-round draft picks
Norfolk Admirals players
Avtomobilist Yekaterinburg players
HC Neftekhimik Nizhnekamsk players
HC Vityaz players
HC Yugra players
Saryarka Karagandy players
HC Ryazan players
Edinburgh Capitals players
MKS Cracovia (ice hockey) players
Sportspeople from Karaganda
Russian ice hockey right wingers
Russian expatriate ice hockey people
Russian expatriate sportspeople in Scotland
Russian expatriate sportspeople in Poland
Russian expatriate sportspeople in Ukraine
Russian expatriate sportspeople in Kazakhstan
Russian expatriate sportspeople in the United States
Expatriate ice hockey players in the United States
Expatriate ice hockey players in Kazakhstan
Expatriate ice hockey players in Scotland
Expatriate ice hockey players in Ukraine
Expatriate ice hockey players in Poland